Calm Air International LP. is a full service airline, offering passenger, charter and freight services in northern Manitoba and the Kivalliq Region of Nunavut. It is owned by Exchange Income Corporation with its main base in Winnipeg, Manitoba.

History 
The airline was established and started operations in 1962. It was founded by Carl Arnold Lawrence Morberg (1936-2005) and his wife, Gail, as a charter service in northern Saskatchewan. In 1976 it took over the Transair passenger service in the Northwest Territories. In 1981, Calm Air took over many of the passenger and cargo routes of Lamb Air. Canadian Airlines acquired a 45% holding in Calm Air in 1987.

On April 8, 2009 Calm Air was purchased by the Exchange Income Corporation (EIC) which also owns Perimeter Aviation, PAL Airlines, Bearskin Airlines, Custom Helicopters and Keewatin Air.

Airline partnerships
Calm Air has codeshare agreement with Canadian North.

Destinations 

As of January 2023, Calm Air operates daily scheduled air services to the following communities:
Manitoba
Churchill (Churchill Airport)
Flin Flon (Flin Flon Airport)
Gillam (Gillam Airport)
The Pas (The Pas Airport)
Thompson (Thompson Airport)
Winnipeg (Winnipeg James Armstrong Richardson International Airport)
Nunavut
Arviat (Arviat Airport)
Baker Lake (Baker Lake Airport)
Chesterfield Inlet (Chesterfield Inlet Airport)
Coral Harbour (Coral Harbour Airport)
Naujaat (Naujaat Airport)
Rankin Inlet (Rankin Inlet Airport)
Sanikiluaq (Sanikiluaq Airport)
Whale Cove (Whale Cove Airport)

Fleet 

As of September 2021, the following aircraft are listed by Transport Canada as being registered to Calm Air:

In addition, Calm Air has access to Boeing 737 Classic 400 series from Canadian North.

References

External links

Calm Air

Airlines established in 1962
Regional airlines of Manitoba
Air Transport Association of Canada
Regional airlines of Nunavut
Companies based in Winnipeg
1962 establishments in Manitoba